Tan Sri Hamdan bin Mohamad is one of several Malaysian businessmen who spearheaded Malaysian companies to overseas nations. He is an executive director, president and chief executive of Ranhill Berhad. He joined Ranhill Bersekutu Sdn Bhd in 1981 and was appointed to the board of Ranhill on 15 November 2000. He completed his studies at the University of Western Australia in 1981 and was given the Master of Science in advanced concrete structures degree in 1986 from the Imperial College of Science and Technology in London, United Kingdom.

Dubbed as Malaysia's Water Baron, he also sits on the board of several private limited companies, including Ranhill Corporation Sdn Bhd and Lambang Optima Sdn Bhd, where he is also a major shareholder.

Honour

Honour of Malaysia
  : Commander of the Order of Loyalty to the Crown of Malaysia (P.S.M.) (2003)

References

External links
 Ranhill Utilities Berhad
 2
 Malaysian Business (16th-28th 2007 ) by Keith Yiu

University of Western Australia alumni
Year of birth missing (living people)
Living people
Malaysian businesspeople
Malaysian people of Malay descent
Commanders of the Order of Loyalty to the Crown of Malaysia